Maurice Bouval (1863–1916) was a French sculptor of the Art Nouveau period.

From 1880 to the first World War, he created a large number of bronze statues or objects including chandeliers, candelabras or table lamps. His main works are Ophelia, Femme assise, Jeune femme, Le Sommeil, Femme aux pavots, Le Secret et la Pensive. He was not a prolific sculptor. He participated in the 1890 Exposition Universelle in Paris and was a member of the Société des Artistes Français.

He was a pupil of Alexandre Falguière.

His works are usually signed M. Bouval.

External links
 Maurice Bouval on Artnet
 

1863 births
1916 deaths
Art Nouveau sculptors
20th-century French sculptors
20th-century French male artists
19th-century French sculptors
French male sculptors
19th-century French male artists